The 1908 United States presidential election in Wyoming took place on November 3, 1908, as part of the 1908 United States presidential election. State voters chose three representatives, or electors, to the Electoral College, who voted for president and vice president.

Wyoming was won by the Secretary of War William Howard Taft (R–Ohio), running with representative James S. Sherman, with 55.43 percent of the popular vote, against representative William Jennings Bryan (D–Nebraska), running with Senator John W. Kern, with 39.67 percent of the popular vote.

Bryan had previously won Wyoming against William McKinley in 1896 but had lost the state to McKinley in 1900.

Results

Results by county

See also
 United States presidential elections in Wyoming

Notes

References

Wyoming
1908
1908 Wyoming elections